Huang Ying or Ying Huang is the name of:

Singers
Ying Huang (soprano) (born 1968), Chinese operatic soprano
Huang Ying (pop singer) (born 1989), Chinese female pop singer

Sportspeople
Huang Ying (water polo) (born 1957), Chinese male water polo player
Huang Ying (gymnast) (born 1977), Chinese rhythmic gymnast

See also
Huangying Township, a township in Chongqing, China